Augusto Lamela da Silva (born 6 February 1939) is a Portuguese former footballer who played as a right back but also as a right midfielder.

Over nine seasons, he amassed Primeira Liga totals of 73 matches and ten goals.

Club career
Born in Barcelos, Braga District, Silva moved at a young age to Guimarães to learn the job of metalworker for a Textile industry, belonging to the president of local Vitória SC. While at the club he suffered two serious injuries to his meniscus, but eventually recovered.

Silva was signed by S.L. Benfica in 1962, and made his debut on 23 September of the same year against Luso FC. His best input at the Estádio da Luz consisted of 17 games in the 1965–66 season, contributing a runner-up finish.

In January 1967, in a tour to Santiago, Silva suffered a cerebrovascular accident that left him permanently incapable of ever playing football, affecting his right eye, his speech and his motor skills. Coach Fernando Riera remained with him until he recovered enough to return to Portugal on 17 February; he then worked as a doorman for Benfica, also occupying administrative positions for them.

Personal life
In a seven-month span in 1961, Silva lost a daughter and a son (both aged seven months) to poliomyelitis.

Honours
Benfica
Primeira Liga: 1962–63, 1963–64, 1964–65, 1966–67
Taça de Portugal: 1963–64

References

External links

1939 births
Living people
People from Barcelos, Portugal
Portuguese footballers
Association football defenders
Association football midfielders
Primeira Liga players
Vitória S.C. players
S.L. Benfica footballers
Sportspeople from Braga District